Vexillum albocinctum is a species of small sea snail, marine gastropod mollusk in the family Costellariidae, the ribbed miters.

Description
Individuals can grow to 11.1 mm.

Distribution
This organism is known to be present in the Southern United States location or region but is not exclusive; other regions may also be reported.

References

External links
 Adams, C. B. (1845). Specierum novarum conchyliorum, in Jamaica repertorum, synopsis. Proceedings of the Boston Society of Natural History. 2: 1-17.

albocinctum
Gastropods described in 1845